The Kenton Touch (subtitled Portraits in Strings) is an album by bandleader and pianist Stan Kenton featuring a string section. As with his previous album Lush Interlude, the trumpet and sax sections were omitted and Bud Shank's flute and alto sax is the only woodwind used. It was recorded in 1958 and released on the Capitol label.

Reception

The Allmusic review by Ron Wynn noted "A 1958 Kenton album that's pretty straightforward and less ambitious than many during that period. The arrangements are standard, the brass section plays with more restraint and less volume, and it's among his best conventional jazz releases".

Track listing
All compositions by Stan Kenton and Pete Rugolo except where noted.
 "Salute" (Rugolo) - 3:52 	
 "Monotony" - 3:41
 "Elegy for Alto" - 3:34 
 "Theme for Sunday" (Kenton) - 5:16
 "Ballade for Drums" (Rugolo) - 3:09
 "Minor Riff"  - 3:28
 "The End of the World (Early Duke)" (Rugolo, Steve Allen) - 2:27
 "Opus in Chartreuse" (Gene Roland) - 3:23
 "Painted Rhythm" (Kenton) - 5:14 	
 "A Rose for David" (Rugolo) - 2:42 
Recorded at Capitol Studios in Hollywood, CA on December 22, 1958 (tracks 3-5 & 7-10) and December 23, 1958 (tracks 1, 2 & 6).

Personnel
Stan Kenton - piano, conductor
Milt Bernhart, Kent Larsen, Archie Le Coque - trombone 
Bob Olson, Bill Smiley - bass trombone 
Bud Shank - flute, alto flute, alto saxophone
Laurindo Almeida - guitar
Red Kelly, Red Mitchell - bass 
Milt Holland (tracks 3, 4, 8 & 10), Shelly Manne  (tracks 1, 2, 5-7 & 9) - drums 
Larry Bunker - percussion
Israel Baker, Harold Dicterow (tracks 3-5 & 7-10), David Frisina, James Getzoff (tracks 3-5 & 7-10), Ben Gill, Dan Lube (tracks 1, 2 & 6), Alfred Lustgarten, Erno Neufeld (tracks 1, 2 & 6), Lou Raderman (tracks 1, 2 & 6), Nathan Ross, Eudice Shapiro, Felix Slatkin, Paul Shure (tracks 3-5 & 7-10), Marshall Sosson, Gerald Vinci - violin
Sam Boghossian (tracks 1, 2 & 6), Alvin Dinkin  (tracks 3-5 & 7-10), Virginia Majewski, Paul Robyn, David Sterkin - viola
David Fillerman (tracks 1, 2 & 6), Victor Gottlieb (tracks 1, 2 & 6),  Armand Kaproff (tracks 3-5 & 7-10). Edgar Lustgarten, Kurt Reher (tracks 3-5 & 7-10, Eleanor Slatkin  - cello
Pete Rugolo - arranger

References

Stan Kenton albums
1959 albums
Capitol Records albums
Albums arranged by Pete Rugolo
Albums conducted by Stan Kenton

Albums recorded at Capitol Studios
Albums produced by Lee Gillette